CBJ800 “Pegasus”, which stands for Chinese Business Jet 800, is a business jet developed by Chengdu Aircraft Industry Group, with collaboration of Shenyang Aircraft Corporation, Hongdu Aviation Industry Group,  AVIC International and Chengdu Industry Investment Corporation. The model was first shown in  Zhuhai Airshow 2012 and it was called Chinese Next Generation Business Jet at that time. In Chengdu International Business and General Aviation Exhibition of 2015, the newly showed model was painted with the formal name of CBJ800. According to the report from the meeting, the project will formally be started in 2016, and jet will be pushed to the market in 7-8 years.

Specifications

See also

References

Proposed aircraft of China